Number 51 Squadron is a squadron of the Royal Air Force. Since 2014 it has operated the Boeing RC-135W Airseeker R.1, more commonly referred to as the Rivet Joint, from RAF Waddington, Lincolnshire.

It had previously flown the Hawker Siddeley Nimrod R.1 from 1974 until 2011. Following the Nimrod's retirement, crews from No. 51 Squadron trained alongside the United States Air Force on the RC-135W Rivet Joint, which was being acquired by the RAF under the Airseeker project.

History

World War I
51 Squadron Royal Flying Corps flew B.E.2 and B.E.12 aircraft; the squadron formed at Thetford, Norfolk, before moving its headquarters to the airfield that later became RAF Marham. The squadron's primary role during the First World War was defence of the UK against German Zeppelin raids. It also used the Avro 504K to give night flying training to new pilots. The squadron disbanded in 1919.

Interwar years
The squadron was reborn when 'B' Flight of 58 Squadron was renumbered as 51 Squadron at Driffield in March 1937, flying Virginias and Ansons. At this time the squadron badge was being chosen and a goose was chosen as a play on words: the squadron was flying the Anson and the Latin for goose is Anser. It was also appropriate for a bomber unit to have a heavy wild fowl to represent it.

World War II

51 Squadron dropped leaflets over Germany on the very first night of the Second World War, using the Whitley aircraft.

In February 1942, led by the legendary Percy Pickard, 51 Squadron carried 119 paratroops and an RAF flight sergeant skilled in electronics to Bruneval, France, in converted Whitleys. The men then carried out a very successful raid on a German radar installation, removing parts of a new type known as a Würzburg, which they took back to Britain.

A brief period as part of Coastal Command patrolling against the U-Boats in the Bay of Biscay preceded the re-equipment with the Halifax in 1942. 51 spent the rest of the war in Europe flying as part of No. 4 Group RAF, RAF Bomber Command's strategic bombing offensive against the Nazis, operating from RAF Snaith in East Yorkshire.

Postwar
The squadron became part of Transport Command with Stirlings and later Yorks following the end of the European war, transporting men and material to India and the Far East. The squadron disbanded in 1950, after taking part in the Berlin Airlift.

The squadron again reformed in the 'Special Duties' role when No. 192 Squadron RAF was renumbered at RAF Watton on 21 August 1958, moving to nearby Wyton in April 1963. It was only following the end of the Cold War that the signals intelligence role of the squadron was publicly recognised. Signals intelligence encompasses both Electronic Intelligence (Elint) and Communications Intelligence (Comint). The squadron flew this role using de Havilland Comets. The Comets were replaced by a modified version of the Hawker-Siddeley Nimrod in 1974.

One of the three Nimrods on strength was retired at the end of November 2009 with the other two remaining in service until June 2011. The Nimrods were replaced by three Boeing RC-135W Rivet Joint aircraft. In January 2011 personnel from 51 Squadron began training at Offutt Air Force Base in the US for conversion to the RC-135. Crews were to be deployed on joint missions with the USAF 343rd Reconnaissance Squadron until the new aircraft became available. The first RC135W (ZZ664) was delivered to the Royal Air Force on 12 November 2013, and entered operational service in 2014, taking part in Operation Shader against ISIL in Iraq and Syria.

Aircraft operated
Aircraft operated have included:

B.E.2
B.E.12
FE2b
Martinsyde G.100
Avro 504K
Sopwith Camel
Vickers Virginia Mk10
Avro Anson Mk1
Armstrong Whitworth Whitley Mk 2–5
Handley Page Halifax Mk B2 and B3
Short Stirling Mk5
Avro York
de Havilland Comet Mk2R
English Electric Canberra B2
Handley Page Hastings C1
Hawker Siddeley Nimrod R1
Boeing RC-135W Rivet Joint

See also
Other Nimrod squadrons
No. 42 (Reserve) Squadron – Nimrod OCU
No. 120 Squadron
No. 201 Squadron
No. 206 Squadron
List of Royal Air Force aircraft squadrons
No. 51 Squadron RAF Regiment

References

Notes

Bibliography

Ford, Keith S. Snaith days: Life with 51 Squadron, 1942–45. Warrington, Cheshire, UK: Compaid Graphics, 1993. .
Ford, Keith S. Swift and Sure: Eighty Years of 51 Squadron RAF (York's Own Squadron). Preston, Lancashire, UK: Compaid Graphics, 1997. .
 
Halley, James J. The Squadrons of the Royal Air Force and Commonwealth, 1918–1988. Tonbridge, Kent, UK: Air-Britai (Historians) Ltd., 1988. .
 Lake, Jon. "Wyton's Cold War spyplanes: No 51 Squadron's Canberras". International Air Power Review. Volume 1, 2001. Norwalk, Connecticut, USA: AIRtime Publishing. pp. 130–137. . ISSN 1473-9917.
Moyes, Philip J.R. Bomber Squadrons of the RAF and Their Aircraft. London: Macdonald and Jane's (Publishers) Ltd., 1964 (Revised edition 1976). 
Rawlings, John D.R. Coastal, Support and Special Squadrons of the RAF and Their Aircraft. London: Jane's Publishing Company Ltd., 1982. .
Rawlings, John D.R. Fighter Squadrons of the RAF and Their Aircraft. London: Macdonald and Jane's (Publishers) Ltd., 1969 (Revised edition 1976, reprinted 1978). .
Ward, Chris. Royal Air Force Bomber Command Squadron Profiles, Number 16: 51 Squadron – Swift and Sure. Berkshire, UK: Ward Publishing, 1998.

External links

51 Squadron
Squadron histories of 51–55 sqn on RAFweb
Squadron website
51 Squadron
Article in Metro

051 Squadron
051 Squadron
Signals intelligence units and formations
Military units and formations established in 1916
Military units and formations of the United Kingdom in the Falklands War
1916 establishments in the United Kingdom